The First State Bank of Buxton is a bank in Buxton, North Dakota. Its former building at 423 Broadway St. in Buxton, built in 1884, is listed on the U.S. National Register of Historic Places.  The historic building was listed on the National Register of Historic Places in 1978.

Its significance is asserted to be for its architecture and for its association with Oliver S. Hanson, who established the bank.

References

External links

Commercial buildings completed in 1884
Bank buildings on the National Register of Historic Places in North Dakota
National Register of Historic Places in Traill County, North Dakota
1884 establishments in Dakota Territory
Banks based in North Dakota